Natrunaiyappar Temple(நற்றுணையப்பர் ஆலயம்) is a Hindu temple dedicated to Shiva, located in the village of Ponsei or Thirunanipalli(Chola Nadu - South of Kaveri), Mayiladuthurai district, East-Central Tamil Nadu, South India. It's one of the holy place "Tevaram has been sung on the primary god of the Shiva (Paadal Petra sthalam)". From north side Chidambaram to The Mahendra Mountain totally 63 Shiva temples have been presented. It's also one of the part of 63 Shiva's holy places. Once upon a time Ponsei was ruled under Chola dynasty

Etymology 

The First rajendra chola has created a town Gangaikonda cholapuram with most beautiful and rare sculptural techniques. It's similar to earlier creation of Rajaraja emperor's Thanjai Brihadeeswarar Temple. The Chola conquest of Kadaram (Kedah) and Srivijaya, and their continued commercial contacts with the Chinese Empire, enabled them to influence the local cultures. So that Emperor Rajendra chola also called "Poorva Desamum Vendra Kopparakesari Varman "was awarded a special title. So this place named Kadarankondan, Later name has to convert into Kidarankondan.

Other reasons 

There is a significant correlation between Thirugnanasambandar and nanipalli. His mother Bhagwati was born in this place. Thirugnasamabandar has sung a song to lord Shiva. Then this place has to change Parched wasteland to Seashore land, then he converted into Agricultural Land. So that Thirunanaipalli called Ponsei. After this incident sambandar called his named ThiruGnana Sambanthar.

Features 

 Cauvery River, though flows eastward turns here westward. This is called Basvamangini.
 157th of 275 temples that are revered in the verses of Tevaram and are amongst the greatest Shiva temples. The temple is counted as one of the temples built on the banks of River Kaveri.

Narrunaiyappar Temple,Thirunanipalli 

In this temple Lord Shiva called Natrunaiyappar. In the mind of the fear he can remove and guide into good path of your life so-called Natrunaiyappar. Lord shiva grace with Malaiyaan madanthai and Parvatha Putthiri are his wives.
From Tamil Saiva hymns, Tirugnana Sambanthar,Appar and Sundarar were sung a song to Thirunanipalli Natrunaiyappar. These poems are appeared in Tevara Thirumuraigal.

Thirugnanasambandar was sung a song into Thirunanipalli Natrunaiyappar called Kaaraigal Kukaimullai(காரைகள் கூகைமுல்லை)
காரைகள் கூகைமுல்லை களவாகை ஈகை
படர்தொடரி கள்ளி கவினிச்
சூரைகள் பம்மிவிம்மு சுடுகா டமர்ந்த
சிவன்மேய சோலை நகர்தான்
தேரைக ளாரைசாய மிதிகொள்ள வாளை
குதிகொள்ள வள்ளை துவள
நாரைக ளாரல்வார வயன்மேதி வைகும்
நனிபள்ளி போலு நமர்காள்.

Translation
Kāraikaḷ, kūkai, mullai, kaḷa, vākai, īkai, spreading toṭari and kaḷḷi growing beautifully and luxuriantly.
the city with gardens which Civaṉ who loved the cremation ground where cūraikal which grow crowded are full, desired to dwell.
the frogs trample on ārai to make it bend.
the scabbard fish leap the creeping hindweed becomes flexible when the cranes catch in a sweep a kind of fish called ārai People belonging to our religion!
is Naṉipaḷḷi where the buffaloes wallow in the fields.

 11 tevara poems-84th praise-II Volume of Thirumurai- wrote by Sambandar for Thirunanipalli Natrunaiyappar.

Tirunavukkarasar was sung a song to Thirunanipalli Natrunaiyappar called Mutrunai Yayinanai(முற்றுணை யாயினானை)
முற்றுணை யாயி னானை மூவர்க்கும் முதல்வன் றன்னைச்
சொற்றுணை யாயி னானைச் சோதியை யாத ரித்து
உற்றுணர்ந் துருகி யூறி யுள்கசி வுடைய வர்க்கு
நற்றுணை யாவர் போலு நனிபள்ளி யடிக ளாரே.

English-Translation
Civaṉ who is the companion from time immemorial the origin of the trinity of Piramaṉ, 
Māl and Uruttiraṉ who can be understood by the help of knowledge of ākamam - 
who is the help to understand the correct meaning of vetams cherishing 
with love the light for those whose hearts melt being immersed having realised him intimately, 
Civaṉ in naṉipaḷḷi will become a good companion and guide.

 9 tevara poems-70th praise-Fourth(IV) Thirumurai- written by Thirunavukkarasar.

Sundarar-Aadhiyan Aadhiraiyan(ஆதியன் ஆதிரையன்)
ஆதியன் ஆதிரை யன்அயன் மால்அறி தற்கரிய
சோதியன் சொற்பொரு ளாய்ச்சுருங் காமறை நான்கினையும்
ஓதியன் உம்பர்தங் கோனுல கத்தினுள் எவ்வுயிர்க்கும்
நாதியன் நம்பெரு மான்நண்ணும் ஊர்நனி பள்ளியதே.

English-Translation
Civaṉ is the source of all things.
he has the star Ātirai as his favourite star.
is the light that Ayaṉ and Māl could not know.
being himself the words and their meanings.
he recited with the proper intonation the four elaborate vētams.
is the chief of the celestials in heaven.
naṉipaḷḷi is the place that our Lord who is the chief of all living being in this world, dwells.

 10 tevara poems written by sundarar in seventh(7th) volume of thirumurai of 97th praise to Thirunanipalli Natrunaiyappar.

Features of Temple 
• Lord Shiva granted His wedding darshan to Lord Vinayaka and Sage Agastya.
•Appar, Sundarar and Thirugna Sambandar wrote a poem's to Thirunanipalli Natrunaiyappar in Tevara Tirumuraigal.
•106th temple in 275 shiva temples where appeared in Teveram.
•In a period of chola this temple called “Jayan konda valanaattu aakkoor naattupirathameyamaagiya nanipalli
(ஜயங் கொண்ட வளநாட்டு ஆக்கூர் நாட்டுப்பிரமதேயமாகிய நனிபள்ளி)"
•Lot of rare and most beautiful sculptures appeared in a temple. These are all pride of Chola Empire.
•This is 43rd Shiva temple in the southern bank of Cauvery praised in Tevaram hymns.
•Sanctum sanctorum tower is huge size. Never seen these sized Sanctum sanctorum tower in any other temples in India.

Festivals 

Every year from the date of 7 April to 13 April where celebrating a Chithirai Thiruvizha.

History of the temple 
The age of the temple is nearly 1000 years. The ancestor of Rajaraja Chola, Parantaka Chola I (907–950) built this temple for Nanipalli Natrunaiyappar. It is a 9th-century temple. The sanctum sanctorum is very big in size that facilitated an elephant to worship Lord directly inside. The sanctum sanctorum and the mandaps speak volumes of the aesthetic sense and architectural skill of ancient sculptors of Tamil Nadu.

The architecture of the Chola stands pride of the Tamil Civilization.
In this temple wall Vijayalaya Chola statue has appeared.

Route to Temple 
13 km distance far from Mayiladuthurai. Poombukar,Thiruvenkaadu,perunthottam,mangaimadam route buses are reached.
Mayiladuthurai---->Ponsei(Route to Poombuhar)
Chidambaram----->Karuvi----->Ponsei(Route to Mayiladuthurai)
Thirukkadaiyur--->Karuvi--->Ponsei(Route to Mayildauthurai)
Thirukadaiyur---->Sembonar Kovil--->Ponsei(Route to Poombuhar)

References

External links 

 திருநனிப்பள்ளி கோயில் தலவரலாறு
 நற்றுணையப்பர் கோவில், திருநனிபள்ளி
 திருநனிபள்ளி-காரைகள் கூகைமுல்லை
 திருநனிபள்ளி ( புஞ்சை)
 திருநனிபள்ளி-ஆதியன் ஆதிரையன்
 ஏழாம் திருமுறை - தேவாரப் பதிகங்கள் - 7.097.திருநனிபள்ளி
 திருநனிபள்ளி (புஞ்ஜை )
 பாடல் பெற்ற சிவஸ்தலங்கள்
 திருநனிபள்ளி-காரைகள் கூகைமுல்லை
 Thirunanipalli-Aadhiyan-Aadhirai
 Thirunanipalli-Songs
 SCN043 thirunanipalli, punjai nanipalli-Wiki Mapia
 Thirunanipalli-Kaaraigal-Koogai
 Shiva Temple, Ponsai ( Thirunanipalli)
 திருஆரூர்
 திருப்பரங்குன்றம்-மலையான் மடந்தை
 சிவபிரான் மலர் வழிபாடு-மலையான் மடந்தை

Miniature sculptures around the shrine

Shiva temples in Mayiladuthurai district
9th-century Hindu temples
Padal Petra Stalam